Ali Rıfat Çağatay (1867–1935) was a Turkish composer, oud virtuoso and academic, who served as the founding president of the Türk Musikisi Ocağı (The Institute for Turkish Music) and the long-term president of the Şark Musiki Cemiyeti (The Society for Eastern Music).

He was noted for his efforts to harmonize Classical Turkish Music with elements of western musical heritage, his vocal abilities, as well as his talents on the oud, the violoncello, the tanbur, and the kemenche.

Notable works include the original musical arrangement for the Turkish National Anthem, used between 1924-1930 until the acceptance of the new composition by Osman Zeki Üngör, as well as other national favorites.

Biography
Born in İstanbul in 1867, Çağatay was the eldest of four sons, born to a family of musicians, poets, writers, soldiers and medium-rank government employees. He married the Egyptian Princess Zahra a younger Halfsister to Prince Said Halim Pasha and got a son, Cafer Çağatay, who was a notable football player for Fenerbahçe. After the death of Princess Zahra in 1922, he married secondly in 1923 Nimet Khanum.

Çağatay died on 3 March 1935, in İstanbul.

See also

 İstiklâl Marşı
 Mehmet Akif Ersoy

References
 Anthology Database – Ali Rıfat Çağatay 
 Genel Başvuru ve Bilgi Sitesi, TürkçeBilgi Encyclopedia  – Ali Rıfat Çağatay  

1867 births
1935 deaths
Musicians from Istanbul
Turkish classical composers
Male classical composers